Clare Dawkins ( Crawley) (born March 20, 1981) is an American television personality, best known for her role as the runner-up on the 18th season of ABC's The Bachelor and as the lead of the 16th season of The Bachelorette. She also appeared on seasons 1 and 2 of Bachelor in Paradise, and on Bachelor Winter Games.

Early life
Crawley was born in Sacramento, California and is the youngest of six sisters. She is of Mexican descent on her mother's side. Her father died from brain cancer in 2004. Crawley also completed hairstylist training while growing up in Sacramento, California.

Television career

The Bachelor

Crawley first appeared as a contestant on Juan Pablo Galavis's season of The Bachelor, where she made it to the final two but was rejected in favor of fellow contestant Nikki Ferrell. During her time on The Bachelor, she and Galavis went out at night to swim in the ocean together, which Galavis later called a mistake as he did not want to set a bad example for his daughter. After Galavis rejected her, Crawley called him out for the inappropriate language he used regarding their time together, which was met with widespread praise by viewers.

Bachelor in Paradise

After The Bachelor, Crawley appeared on the first two seasons of Bachelor in Paradise; however, she was unsuccessful in finding love and left voluntarily on both seasons.

Bachelor Winter Games

Crawley returned for The Bachelor Winter Games, where she was involved in a love triangle with Christian Rauch and Benoit Beauséjour-Savard. Although Crawley left alone, the reunion special on February 22, 2018, revealed she and Beauséjour-Savard had gotten back together offscreen. Beauséjour-Savard proposed to Crawley on stage, and she accepted. On April 6, 2018, the couple revealed they had broken up.

The Bachelorette

Crawley was announced as The Bachelorette on  March 2, 2020, on Good Morning America. This appearance makes her the oldest Bachelorette in the show's history, taking over from Rachel Lindsay who was 32 on her season.

Personal life
Outside of her work on television, Crawley is a hairstylist at De Facto Salon in Sacramento, California. She got engaged to Dale Moss during the 16th season of The Bachelorette. They announced their breakup on January 19, 2021, but reunited a month later. They broke up for good in September 2021. On October 10, 2022, it was reported that Crawley got engaged to Ryan Dawkins, her boyfriend of 1 year, over the weekend in Las Vegas. They married on February 1, 2023, in Sacramento.

References

External links 
Clare Crawley Website

Living people
People from Sacramento, California
Bachelor Nation contestants
1981 births
American people of Mexican descent
Television personalities from California
American women television personalities
Hispanic and Latino American people in television